Sarah Rose Hunter (born 7 October 2003) is an Australian soccer player who plays for Sydney FC in the A-League Women. She has previously played for Western Sydney Wanderers.

Early life
Hunter grew up in NSW and played for FNSW Institute in New South Wales in her youth.

Club career

Western Sydney Wanderers
In December 2020, Hunter joined A-League Women club Western Sydney Wanderers ahead of the 2020–21 W-League season. Making her debut for the club in a 4–1 loss to Newcastle Jets, coming on in the 75th minute for Julie-Ann Russell.

Sydney FC
In September 2021, Hunter joined A-League Women club Sydney FC.

International career
In 2022, Hunter made her debut and scored her first goal for the Young Matildas in a 5–1 win over New Zealand. Hunter was a part of Australia's side at the 2022 FIFA U-20 Women's World Cup playing in all three games against Costa Rica, Brazil and Spain.

Hunter was a part of Australia U23's team at the 2022 AFF Women's Championship, featuring in four games and scoring one goal against Singapore.

References

External links
 

2003 births
Australian women's soccer players
Living people
Western Sydney Wanderers FC (A-League Women) players
Sydney FC (A-League Women) players
A-League Women players
Women's association football midfielders
Sportswomen from New South Wales
Soccer players from New South Wales